The 2014 New York Red Bulls season was the Red Bulls' nineteenth season in Major League Soccer, the top division for soccer in the United States.

In 2014, the Red Bulls participated in the CONCACAF Champions League for the second time in team history (the first time being 2010). The team also entered the 2014 MLS season as the reigning Supporters Shield winners.

Background

The previous season saw the Red Bulls under new leadership with both former general manager Erik Solér and head coach Hans Backe not being given contract extensions and thus relieved from their duties. They were replaced by Jérôme de Bontin, who took over as general manager, Andy Roxburgh as sporting director, and then-assistant coach Mike Petke as new head coach. During the winter pre-season the club made numerous roster moves with several regulars such as Sébastien Le Toux, Joel Lindpere, Wilman Conde, and Kenny Cooper leaving the team. The club also released disappointing designated player Rafael Márquez. In terms of notable signings, the team managed to sign in Fabián Espíndola, Jámison Olave, former Brazil international Juninho, Eric Alexander, Jonny Steele, and former France international Péguy Luyindula.

It took the Red Bulls five games before finally winning their first match of the 2013 MLS season against the Philadelphia Union at Red Bull Arena by a score of 2–1 on March 30. A 4–0 victory over the Montreal Impact at Red Bull Arena on July 13 turned out to be the turning point for the Red Bulls season as from then on the Red Bulls went on to win eight of their last fourteen games that season and thus secure the Supporters Shield on October 27 in their last match against the Chicago Fire at Red Bull Arena. However, despite winning the Supporters Shield, the Red Bulls failed to make it farther than that as the team were eliminated from the 2013 MLS Cup Playoffs by the Houston Dynamo in the first round they played in.

Roster transactions

Pre-season
The first roster move by the Red Bulls was announced on November 21, 2013 when it was announced that two-time MLS Cup winning goalkeeper Kevin Hartman had decided to retire from the game. Then, four days later, it was announced that the team had decided to decline the contract options of defenders David Carney and Brandon Barklage. Then on November 27, the Red Bulls announced another departure from the team by parting ways with defender Heath Pearce.

The Red Bulls then announced their first non-departure news of the off-season on December 4 when they announced that defender Kosuke Kimura, midfielder Eric Alexander, and forward Péguy Luyindula had all re-signed with the team. Then on December 10 it was announced by Major League Soccer that the Red Bulls had also declined the contract option on forwards Fabián Espíndola and Andre Akpan when they released the list of eligible players for the 2013 MLS Re-Entry Draft. However, on December 12 it was announced that Akpan had re-signed with the Red Bulls.

The Red Bulls first signing of the season came on December 13 when they signed former American international Bobby Convey from Toronto FC in a trade for the Red Bulls' first-round pick in the 2014 MLS SuperDraft and first-round pick in the 2016 Supplemental Draft. The Red Bulls also got Toronto FC's second-round pick in the 2014 SuperDraft in the trade. The Red Bulls then re-signed goalkeeper Luis Robles and defender Roy Miller on December 16 before parting ways with defender Markus Holgersson on January 2, 2014.

Then, right before pre-season training began, the Red Bulls signed Spanish defender Armando Lozano from Córdoba before signing English fullback Richard Eckersley via a trade with Toronto FC for the Red Bulls fourth round pick in the 2017 MLS SuperDraft. Then, on January 29, it was announced that 2013 Team Defensive Player of the Year Jámison Olave had re-signed for the Red Bulls.

Finally, on March 6, right before the season began, the Red Bulls announced the signings of Cameroonian defender Ambroise Oyongo and draft picks Chris Duvall and Eric Stevenson.

During the season
The Red Bulls made their first roster transaction during the season on July 10 when they mutually agreed to part ways with midfielder Jonny Steele. Steele went on to sign for the Newcastle Jets of the A-League three days later. Then, later during the month of July, the Red Bulls sent out midfielders Ian Christianson and Connor Lade to Orlando City of the USL Pro and New York Cosmos of the NASL respectively in order to gain more game time.

The Red Bulls then made their first signing of the summer transfer window on July 28 when they secured the signature of trialist Damien Perrinelle for the remainder of the season. Two weeks later the Red Bulls traded Andre Akpan to the New England Revolution for Saër Sène.

In

Out

Loaned out

Re-signed

Draft picks

Team information

Squad information
As of July 29, 2014.

Pre-season and Friendlies

Pre-season
On January 9 it was confirmed that the Red Bulls would begin their pre-season preparation on January 24 before heading off to Orlando on January 27. On January 23 the official pre-season roster was revealed by the Red Bulls. On February 5 the team's first friendly was official announced to be against the Philadelphia Union on February 12 at EverBank Field. The team went on to win that match-up 2–1 thanks to goals from Lloyd Sam and Thierry Henry; the Union goal coming from Jack McInerney. However, seven days later, the team lost their next pre-season match to the previous season's MLS Cup champions Sporting Kansas City 0–1 in the opening match of the 2014 Walt Disney World Pro Soccer Classic. Despite the defeat, head coach Mike Petke still commented positively about the defense saying that "We had long spells without the ball, but Kansas City never really threatened, which we wanted to see from our guys. Get into good defensive shape and then we exploded out of that for three or four opportunities."

Three days after losing their opener in the pre-season tournament the Red Bulls went on to win 3–0 over the Montreal Impact. Roy Miller, Ruben Bover, and Bradley Wright-Phillips were the goalscorers in this match. The Red Bulls and Ruben Bover both continued their good form when the team defeated the Fluminense U23 side 1–0 thanks to a goal from Bover. The team then finished off their pre-season with an emphatic 4–4 draw to future MLS newcomers Orlando City SC. Wright-Phillips scored a double while Jonny Steele and Ibrahim Sekagya scored the other two goals to round the pre-season off.

Summer friendlies
On March 26 it was announced that the Red Bulls would play a summer friendly match against English Premier League side Arsenal at Red Bull Arena on July 26. The friendly match ended 1–0 to the Red Bulls. The goal came from a Thierry Henry corner which was headed by Ibrahim Sekagya to Bradley Wright-Phillips who tucked-it into the back of the net.

Major League Soccer season

Following the 2013 season in which the Red Bulls won the Supporters' Shield, the team began the 2014 season with a 4–1 defeat against the Vancouver Whitecaps FC at BC Place on March 8. Kenny Miller scored the first goal of the game from the penalty-spot for the Whitecaps in the 34th minute before Sebastián Fernández doubled the lead for Vancouver in the 49th minute. Kenny Miller then scored his second goal of the game and the third for Vancouver in the 77th minute of the match before Pedro Morales scored the fourth goal for the Whitecaps. Bradley Wright-Phillips scored the lone Red Bull goal in the 91st minute. The team then played their home opener son seven days later against the Colorado Rapids. The match ended in a 1–1 draw in which Thiery Henry opened the scoring in the 57th minute before the Rapids equalized through a Vicente Sánchez penalty. The next week the Red Bulls went back on the road to face the Chicago Fire where they drew the match once again 1–1. The Red Bulls went behind early in the sixth minute through Chicago's Jeff Larentowicz before Dax McCarty grabbed the Red Bull equalizer in the 21st minute. The Red Bulls then finished the month of March with yet another 1–1 draw, this time against Chivas USA who took the lead in the 25th minute through an Erick Torres penalty before Péguy Luyindula headed home the equalizer in the 95th minute.

The beginning of April started as March finished, with another draw. This time the draw result came away at the Montreal Impact at the Olympic Stadium. The game finished 2–2 with both Jonny Steele and Péguy Luyindula scoring for the Red Bulls and Andrés Romero and Felipe finding the net for Montreal. Unfortunately the team's fortunes did not improve as the Red Bulls fell to their second loss of the season in the very next match against rivals D.C. United at RFK Stadium. A fourth-minute strike from Davy Arnaud lead to the 1–0 defeat. However, in the next game, the Red Bulls managed to win their first match of the season against the Philadelphia Union at Red Bull Arena. Thierry Henry started the scoring in the 57th minute before Lloyd Sam doubled the score ten minutes later. Former Red Bull, Sébastien Le Toux, then managed to bring one back for the Union from the spot in the 80th minute but the Red Bulls managed to hang on for all three points. That result was then followed up with an even better result against the Houston Dynamo. In their first match since the Dynamo knocked the Red Bulls out of the MLS Cup the previous season the Red Bulls ran riot against the Dynamo, scoring four goals in a 4–0 rout. Bradley Wright-Phillips scored his first ever hat-trick for the Red Bulls while Thierry Henry scored one as well. The Red Bulls then finished the month off with a draw away from home against the Columbus Crew. A penalty from Jairo Arrieta and a late strike from Bradley Wright-Phillips lead to the 1–1 finish.

The month of May began on a good note for the Red Bulls with a 1–0 away win at FC Dallas at Toyota Stadium. Bradley Wright-Phillips managed to score his sixth goal of the season in the 71st minute to hand the Red Bulls the victory. However, that would be the Red Bulls' only victory of the month as the team then went on a three-game losing streak starting at home to the Chicago Fire. Another hat-trick from Bradley Wright-Phillips and a goal from Tim Cahill were not enough as Chicago found goals through Harrison Shipp, who scored a hat-trick too, Quincy Amarikwa and Patrick Nyarko to win 5–4. The second loss came against big offseason spenders Toronto FC away from home at BMO Field. Goals from English international Jermain Defoe and Luke Moore saw Toronto FC run out 2–0 winners. Finally the third loss came back at home against the Portland Timbers. The Red Bulls had taken the lead through a spot-kick goal from Bradley Wright-Phillips, his 10th of the season, before the Timbers scored twice from Maximiliano Urruti to leave the Red Bulls to a 2–1 defeat. The Red Bulls then returned to better results in their next match against Sporting Kansas City away from home. The match ended in a 1–1 draw thanks to Toni opening the scoring for Sporting in the 9th minute before Bradley Wright-Phillips equalized for the Red Bulls in the 50th minute to earn the Red Bulls the point.

The team then entered June with an away rivalry match-up against the New England Revolution at Gillette Stadium, a stadium the team has not won at since they were known as the MetroStars, however, that barren run was finally put to rest with this match. Goals from Eric Alexander and Péguy Luyindula as well as 10 saves from goalkeeper Luis Robles awarded the Red Bulls a 2–0 victory in Foxborough. The Red Bulls then went on a break from the MLS during the 2014 FIFA World Cup group stages and did not play again in MLS till June 27 when they took on recent high spenders Toronto FC at Red Bull Arena. The Red Bulls took the lead going into half-time thanks to a 36th-minute strike from Péguy Luyindula but Toronto FC then took the lead through goals from Jermain Defoe and Gilberto. The Red Bulls then came from behind for the draw with a 93rd minute Bradley Wright-Phillips goal to finish the game at 2–2.

The Red Bulls began the month of July with a road trip to the Houston Dynamo on July 4th. Giles Barnes scored in the first minute for the Dynamo but the Red Bulls came back through a brace from Bradley Wright-Phillips. However, Brad Davis, scored to equalize for the Dynamo through an 81st-minute penalty and thus ended the game at 2–2. The Red Bulls then returned home to Red Bull Arena a week later to take on the Columbus Crew. Bradley Wright-Phillips scored his fifteenth goal of the season to open the scoring for the Red Bulls before Adam Bedell equalized for the Crew in the 39th minute. Thierry Henry then scored in the 45th minute to give the Red Bulls the lead before Lloyd Sam doubled the lead eleven minutes later. Eric Alexander added a fourth goal in the 91st minute to give the Red Bulls a 4–1 victory. However, despite the grand victory at home, the Red Bulls went back on the road four days later against the Philadelphia Union at PPL Park and lost 3–1. Conor Casey opened the scoring for the Union in the 9th minute before Fred scored the second goal of the game. Bradley Wright-Phillips brought one back for the Red Bulls in the 60th minute before former Red Bull Sébastien Le Toux scored the third and final goal of the game for the Union from the penalty spot. After the defeat the Red Bulls once again returned home to face the San Jose Earthquakes. Bradley Wright-Phillips scored his eighteenth goal of the season from the penalty spot in the 33rd minute before Steven Lenhart scored the equalizer in the 85th minute to have the match end 1–1.

After a quick club friendly with Premier League side Arsenal, the Red Bulls went on the road to face Real Salt Lake at Rio Tinto Stadium on July 30. Joao Plata scored the opening goal of the game for Salt Lake in the 18th minute before Thierry Henry scored the equalizer for the Red Bulls in the 57th minute. The match went on to end 1–1. The team then went into August with a match on August 2 against the New England Revolution at Red Bull Arena. After going down a goal in the 20th minute through Charlie Davies before Dax McCarty and Bradley Wright-Phillips scored for the Red Bulls to win 2–1. However, the victory was only short-lived as the Red Bulls lost 1–0 to the Chicago Fire at Toyota Field on August 10. Mike Magee scored for the Fire from the penalty spot.

Matches

Eastern Conference Table

Results summary

Results by round

MLS Cup Playoffs

Knockout round

Conference semifinals

Conference finals

U.S. Open Cup

The Red Bulls will enter the U.S. Open Cup in the fourth round due to being a Major League Soccer team. In May 2014 it was officially announced that the winner between the third-round fixture between the NASL's New York Cosmos and the NPSL's Brooklyn Italians would face the Red Bulls in the fourth round. That game took place on May 28 in which the Cosmos came out as 2–0 winners over the former Open Cup champions.

The Red Bulls then took on the Cosmos at James M. Shuart Stadium on June 14 which ended in a 3–0 defeat for the Red Bulls. Mads Stokkelien and Alessandro Noselli were the goal scorers for the Cosmos as they went on to the fifth round to face the Philadelphia Union.

CONCACAF Champions League

Group stage

On May 28 the Red Bulls were officially drawn into Group 3, along with fellow Major League Soccer side and recent Canadian Championship winners Montreal Impact, and Salvadoran Primera División side FAS.

Player statistics

 [Loaned] — Player has been loaned out for the season.
 [L] — Left the team mid-season.

Top scorers

See also
 2014 in American soccer

References

New York Red Bulls
New York Red Bulls seasons
New York Red Bulls
New York Red Bulls